Pěnička is a Czech surname. Notable people with the surname include:

 Martin Pěnička (1969–2023), Czech footballer
 Pavel Pěnička (born 1967), Czech footballer, brother of Martin

Czech-language surnames